Josefina Ortiz y Ortiz (February 13, 1892 – July 18, 1983) was the First Lady of Mexico and the wife of the Mexican President Pascual Ortiz Rubio. During her time as first lady she started initiatives aiding indigenous children.

Biography 
Josefina Ortiz y Ortiz was born in 1892 on the 13th of February in Copándaro, Michoacán as the third of four children in the family. She studied at the College of Teresian Nuns of Morelia.

In 1920, on the 13th of August, she married Ortiz Rubio, who later became president of Mexico in 1928 with an official mandate until 1934.

First Lady 
After Pascual Oritz Rubio became president in 1920, Josefina Ortiz y Ortiz accompanied him in different public events, both abroad and in Mexico. Both of them served the functions of ambassadors in trips to Brazil and Germany.

On the 5th of February 1930, her husband, the president was attacked and wounded, along with Josefina and his niece. This didn't dissuade the couple from appearing in public events. Josefina Ortiz continued her work on the "La Gota de Leche", assisting indigenous children.

In 1932, two years prior to the end of mandate, her husband Pascual Oritz Rubio resigned the presidency and both of them moved to the United States.

After her husband died, Josefina dedicated herself to taking care of her grandchildren and great-grandchildren until her death on 1983 at the age of 91.

References 

1892 births
1983 deaths
First ladies of Mexico